Andrew Joseph Murtagh (born 6 May 1949) is an Irish-born former English first-class cricketer. He is now a cricket biographer.

Cricket career
Andy Murtagh was a right-handed batsman who bowled right-arm medium pace.  While reading English at Southampton University, he was spotted by Hampshire, making his first-class debut for the county against Gloucestershire in 1973. That same season he made his one-day debut against local rivals Sussex. After the end of the 1973 County Championship Murtagh played for Eastern Province in South Africa, representing them in a single first-class match against Natal.

Murtagh represented Hampshire until 1977, his final first-class match against Gloucestershire and his final one-day match against the same opposition at the United Services Recreation Ground in Portsmouth. He was more at home in the one-day form of the game. In his 48 one-day matches for Hampshire he took 23 wickets at an average of 19.73 with best figures of 5 for 33 against Yorkshire in 1977. He batted mostly in the lower-middle order, with one first-class fifty and one one-day fifty to his name: both scores of 65, which helped Hampshire to victories.

Later career
After he retired from professional cricket, Murtagh became an English teacher and cricket master at Malvern College. He stayed there for 30 years.

Since his retirement from teaching, writing as Andrew Murtagh, he has written several biographies of cricketers:
 A Remarkable Man: The Story of George Chesterton (2012)
 Touched by Greatness: The Story of Tom Graveney, England's Much Loved Cricketer (2014)
 Sundial in the Shade: The Story of Barry Richards, the Genius Lost to Test Cricket (2015)
 Test of Character: The Story of John Holder, Fast Bowler and Test Match Umpire (2016)
 Gentleman and Player: The Story of Colin Cowdrey, Cricket's Most Elegant and Charming Batsman (2017)
 If Not Me, Who? The Story of Tony Greig, the Reluctant Rebel (2020)

Family
His nephews, Tim and Chris Murtagh, have played first-class and List-A cricket – Tim for Surrey, Middlesex and Ireland, Chris for Surrey.

References

External links

1949 births
Cricketers from Dublin (city)
Irish cricketers
Hampshire cricketers
Eastern Province cricketers
Living people
Cricket historians and writers